Taqi Sara (also Romanized as Taqī Sarā; also known as Nāvehrūd and Taqī Maḩalleh) is a village in Asalem Rural District, Asalem District, Talesh County, Gilan Province, Iran. At the 2006 census, its population was 262, in 59 families.

References 

Populated places in Talesh County